Hans-Jürgen Felsen (born 30 January 1940 in Beuthen) is a German former sprinter. He won a bronze medal in the men's 4 × 100 metres relay competition at the 1966 European Athletics Championships.

References

1940 births
Living people
German male sprinters
European Athletics Championships medalists
Universiade medalists in athletics (track and field)
Universiade gold medalists for West Germany
Sportspeople from Bytom
Medalists at the 1961 Summer Universiade
Medalists at the 1965 Summer Universiade